Dianne Lesley Hollister (born 9 December 1947) is a former Australian politician.

Early life
Born in Devonport, Tasmania, she started her career as a teacher.

Political career
In 1989, she was elected to the Tasmanian House of Assembly for Braddon as an Independent Green. In 1992, the five Independent Greens formed the Tasmanian Greens. Hollister held her seat until she was defeated in 1998.

References

1947 births
Living people
Australian Greens members of the Parliament of Tasmania
Members of the Tasmanian House of Assembly
University of Tasmania alumni
Australian schoolteachers
Women members of the Tasmanian House of Assembly